Kid Albums (formerly known as Top Kid Audio) is a music chart published weekly by Billboard magazine which ranks the top selling children's music albums in the United States.  The chart debuted on the issue dated September 9, 1995. It originally began as a 15-position chart, but has now been expanded to 25.  Rankings are compiled by point-of-purchase sales obtained by Nielsen Soundscan data and from legal digital downloads from an all music digital retailers.

The Kid Albums chart features full-length albums that are geared towards children or preteen audiences. Some genres can extend to music for younger children around 1 to 5 years in age, like lullabies, to soundtracks for films that are targeted to children of the age 5-9 to pop, teen pop and other subdivisions of it. Studio albums, EPs, compilation albums and soundtracks are also eligible for the chart.

The first number-one title on the Top Kid Audio chart was a compilation album from Walt Disney Records titled, Classic Disney, Vol. 1.As of the week of November 12, 2022, the number-one album on the chart is the soundtrack to the 1965 primetime animated special A Charlie Brown Christmas.

References

External links
 Current Billboard Kid Albums chart

Billboard charts
Children's albums